Čestmír Kalina (5 May 1922 – 18 October 1988) was a Czech athlete. He competed in the men's shot put at the 1948 Summer Olympics.

References

1922 births
1988 deaths
Athletes (track and field) at the 1948 Summer Olympics
Czech male shot putters
Olympic athletes of Czechoslovakia
Place of birth missing